This is a list of the main career statistics of Australian former tennis player Margaret Court. She won 64 Grand Slam events (24 singles, 19 doubles, 21 mixed doubles), which is a record for a male or female player. Her 24 Grand Slam singles titles and 21 in mixed doubles are also all-time records for both sexes. She achieved a career Grand Slam in singles, doubles, and mixed doubles. She is one of three women to have achieved the calendar year Grand Slam in singles (alongside Steffi Graf and Maureen Connolly), and is the only woman to have achieved the mixed doubles Grand Slam, which she did twice.

Court won more than half of the Grand Slam singles tournaments she played (24 of 47). She won 192 singles titles before and after the Open Era, an all-time record. Her career singles win-loss record was 1,177–106, for a winning percentage of 91.74 percent on all surfaces (hard, clay, grass, carpet), is also an all-time record.
She won at least 100 singles matches in 1965 (113–8), 1968 (107–12), 1969 (104–6), 1970 (110–6), and 1973 (108–6). She won more than 80 percent of her singles matches against top 10 players (297–73) and was the year-end top ranked player seven times.

Grand Slam performance timeline

Singles

Doubles

Mixed doubles 

Note: The shared mixed doubles titles at the Australian Championships/Open in 1965 and 1969 are not always counted in Court's Grand Slam win total because the finals were never played. The Australian Open does officially count them as joint victories. Otherwise, she would have 21 Grand Slam mixed doubles titles, which is reflected in the above table.

Grand Slam finals

Singles: 29 finals (24 titles, 5 runner-ups)

Women's doubles: 33 finals (19 titles, 14 runner-ups)

Mixed doubles: 25 finals (21 titles, 4 runner-ups)

United States Championships/Open singles record 

Court's overall win-loss record at the United States Championships/United States Open was 51–6 (89.5%) in 11 years (1961–1965, 1968–1970, 1972–1973, 1975). (Her win total does not include any first round byes.) Her only losses were to Martina Navratilova in 1975, Billie Jean King in 1972, Maria Bueno in 1968 and 1963, Karen Hantze Susman in 1964, and Darlene Hard in 1961.

Court was 5–1 in finals, 6–2 in semifinals, and 8–2 in quarterfinals. Court failed to reach the quarterfinals only once, in 1964 when she lost to Karen Hantze Susman in the fourth round.

Court was 9–3 in three set matches, 42–3 in two set matches, and 0–0 in deuce third sets, i.e., sets that were tied 5–5 before being resolved.

Court was seeded all 11 years she entered the United States Championships/United States Open.
 seeded No. 1 in 1962 (champion), 1963 (finalist), 1965 (champion), 1970 (champion).
 seeded No. 2 in 1964 (lost fourth round), 1969 (champion), 1973 (champion).
 seeded No. 4 in 1968 (quarterfinalist).
 seeded No. 5 in 1961 (semifinalist), 1972 (semifinalist), 1975 (quarterfinalist).

Court was 16–6 .727 against seeded players and 35–0 against unseeded players.
 Versus No. 1 seeds, Court was 0–2 (Billie Jean King (1972), Darlene Hard (1961)).
 Versus No. 2 seeds, Court was 1–0 (Rosemary Casals (1970)).
 Versus No. 3 seeds, Court was 3–1 (wins: Chris Evert (1973), Nancy Richey (1970), Maria Bueno (1962);loss: Martina Navratilova (1975)).
 Versus No. 4 seeds, Court was 4–1 (wins: Evonne Goolagong (1973), Rosemary Casals (1972), Nancy Richey (1965), Christine Truman (1961);loss: Maria Bueno (1963)).
 Versus No. 5 seeds, Court was 3–1 (wins: Virginia Wade (1969), Billie Jean Moffitt (1965), Darlene Hard (1962);loss: Maria Bueno (1968)).
 Versus No. 6 seeds, Court was 2–0 (Nancy Richey (1969), Françoise Dürr (1965)).
 Versus No. 7 seeds, Court was 2–0 (Virginia Wade (1973), Christine Truman (1963)).
 Versus No. 8 seeds, Court was 1–0 (Sandra Reynolds Price (1962)).
 Versus No. 11 seeds, Court was 0–1 (Karen Hantze Susman (1964)).

Against her major rivals at the United States Championships/United States Open, Court was 3–0 versus Nancy Richey, 2–0 versus Virginia Wade, 2–0 versus Rosemary Casals, 2–0 versus Françoise Dürr, 2–0 versus Christine Truman Janes, 1–0 versus Chris Evert, 1–0 versus Evonne Goolagong Cawley, 1–1 versus Darlene Hard, 1–1 versus Billie Jean King, 1–2 versus Maria Bueno, 0–1 versus Martina Navratilova, and 0–1 versus Karen Hantze Susman.

Wimbledon singles record 

Court's overall win-loss record at Wimbledon was 51–9 (85%) in 12 years (1961–1966, 1968–1971, 1973, 1975). (Her win total includes one mid-match retirement by her opponent, but does not include any first round byes.) Her only losses were to Evonne Goolagong Cawley in 1975 and 1971, Chris Evert in 1973, Ann Haydon-Jones in 1969, Judy Tegart Dalton in 1968, Billie Jean King in 1966 and 1962, Maria Bueno in 1964, and Christine Truman Janes in 1961.

Court was 3–2 in finals, 5–4 in semifinals, and 9–2 in quarterfinals. Court failed to reach the quarterfinals only once, in 1962 during her second Wimbledon. After receiving a bye during the first round, Court lost to unseeded Billie Jean Moffitt in the second round.

Court was 6–6 in three set matches, 45–3 in two set matches, and 0–1 in deuce third sets, i.e., sets that were tied 6–6 before being resolved.

Court was seeded all 12 years she entered Wimbledon. (The tournament seeded only 8 players through 1976.)
 seeded No. 1 in 1962 (lost second round), 1963 (champion), 1964 (finalist), 1966 (semifinalist), 1969 (semifinalist), 1970 (champion), 1971 (finalist), 1973 (semifinalist).
 seeded No. 2 in 1961 (quarterfinalist), 1965 (champion), 1968 (quarterfinalist).
 seeded No. 5 in 1975 (semifinalist).

Court was 10–8 .556 against seeded players. She was 41–1 against unseeded players, her only loss occurring during the second round of the 1962 tournament against Billie Jean Moffitt.
 Versus No. 1 seeds, Court was 1–0 (Maria Bueno (1965)).
 Versus No. 2 seeds, Court was 2–1 (wins: Martina Navratilova (1975), Billie Jean King (1970);loss: Maria Bueno (1964)).
 Versus No. 3 seeds, Court was 1–1 (win: Billie Jean Moffitt (1964);loss: Evonne Goolagong (1971)).
 Versus No. 4 seeds, Court was 1–4 (win: Darlene Hard (1963);losses: Evonne Goolagong Cawley (1975), Chris Evert (1973), Ann Haydon-Jones (1969), Billie Jean King (1966)).
 Versus No. 5 seeds, Court was 1–0 (Rosemary Casals (1970)).
 Versus No. 6 seeds, Court was 0–1 (Christine Truman (1961)).
 Versus No. 7 seeds, Court was 1–1 (win: Julie Heldman (1969);loss: Judy Tegart (1968)).
 Versus No. 8 seeds, Court was 3–0 (Olga Morozova (1973), Helga Niessen Masthoff (1970), Renée Schuurman (1963)).

Against her major rivals at Wimbledon, Court was 3–2 versus Billie Jean King, 2–1 versus Christine Truman Janes, 1–0 versus Martina Navratilova, 1–0 versus Darlene Hard, 1–0 versus Karen Hantze Susman, 1–0 versus Nancy Richey, 1–0 versus Rosemary Casals, 1–1 versus Maria Bueno, 0–1 versus Ann Haydon-Jones, 0–1 versus Chris Evert, and 0–2 versus Evonne Goolagong Cawley.

French Championships/Open singles record 

Court's overall win-loss record at the French Championships/French Open was 47–5 (90.3%) in 10 years (1961–1966, 1969–1971, 1973). (Her win total includes three walkovers but does not include any first round byes.) Her only losses were to Gail Chanfreau in 1971, Nancy Richey in 1966, Lesley Turner Bowrey in 1965, Věra Pužejová Suková in 1963, and Ann Haydon-Jones in 1961.

Court was 5–1 in finals, 6–1 in semifinals, and 7–2 in quarterfinals. Court failed to reach the quarterfinals only once, in 1971 when she lost to unseeded Gail Chanfreau in the third round.

Court was 8–0 in three set matches, 36–5 in two set matches, and 2–0 in deuce third sets, i.e., sets that were tied 5–5 before being resolved.

Court was seeded all 10 years she entered the French Championships/French Open.
 seeded No. 1 in 1963 (quarterfinalist), 1964 (champion), 1965 (finalist), 1966 (semifinalist), 1969 (champion), 1970 (champion), 1971 (lost third round), 1973 (champion).
 seeded No. 2 in 1962 (champion).
 seeded No. 3 in 1961 (quarterfinalist).

Court was 19–4 .826 against seeded players. She was 28–1 against unseeded players, her only loss occurring during the third round of the 1971 tournament against Gail Chanfreau.
 Versus No. 2 seeds, Court was 2–0 (Chris Evert (1973), Maria Bueno (1964)).
 Versus No. 3 seeds, Court was 1–1 (win: Ann Haydon-Jones (1969);loss: Lesley Turner (1965)).
 Versus No. 4 seeds, Court was 4–0 (Evonne Goolagong (1973), Julie Heldman (1970), Nancy Richey (1969 and 1965)).
 Versus No. 5 seeds, Court was 0–1 (Nancy Richey (1966)).
 Versus No. 6 seeds, Court was 1–1 (win: Renée Schuurman (1962);loss: Ann Haydon (1961)).
 Versus No. 7 seeds, Court was 2–0 (Helga Niessen Masthoff (1970), Edda Buding (1962)).
 Versus No. 8 seeds, Court was 4–1 (wins: Katja Ebbinghaus (1973), Rosemary Casals (1970), Kerry Melville (1969), Věra Pužejová Suková (1964);loss: Věra Pužejová Suková (1963)).
 Versus No. 9 seeds, Court was 1–0 (Norma Baylon (1965)).
 Versus No. 13 seeds, Court was 2–0 (Helga Schultze (1964), Lesley Turner (1962)).
 Versus No. 16 seeds, Court was 2–0 (Glenda Swan (1966), Lea Pericoli (1964)).

Against her major rivals at the French Championships/French Open, Court was 2–1 versus Nancy Richey, 1–0 versus Chris Evert, 1–0 versus Evonne Goolagong Cawley, 1–0 versus Maria Bueno, 1–0 versus Rosemary Casals, 1–1 versus Ann Haydon-Jones, 1–1 versus Lesley Turner Bowrey, and 1–1 versus Věra Pužejová Suková.

Australian Championships/Open singles record 

Court's overall win-loss record at the Australian Championships/Australian Open was 61–3 (95.3%) in 14 years (1959–1966, 1968–1971, 1973, 1975). (Her win total includes one walkover but does not include any first round byes.) Her only losses were to Martina Navratilova in 1975, Billie Jean King in 1968, and Mary Carter Reitano in 1959.

Court was 11–1 in finals, 12–0 in semifinals, and 12–1 in quarterfinals. Court failed to reach the quarterfinals only once, in 1959 during her first Australian Championships. Court lost to fourth seeded Mary Carter Reitano in the second round.

Court was 6–0 in three set matches, 54–3 in two set matches, and 2–0 in deuce third sets, i.e., sets that were tied 5–5 before being resolved.

Court was seeded 13 of the 14 years she entered the Australian Championships/Australian Open.
 seeded No. 1 overall in 1961 (champion), 1962 (champion), 1963 (champion), 1964 (champion), 1970 (champion), 1971 (champion), 1973 (champion), 1975 (quarterfinalist).
 seeded No. 1 domestic in 1965 (champion), 1966 (champion).
 seeded No. 2 overall in 1969 (champion).
 seeded No. 7 overall in 1960 (champion).
 seeded No. 7 overall (No. 4 domestic) in 1968 (finalist).
 Unseeded in 1959 (lost second round).

Court was 31–3 .912 against seeded players and 30–0 against unseeded players.
 Versus No. 1 seeds (overall, domestic, or foreign), Court was 5–1 (wins: Billie Jean King (1969), Lesley Turner (1968), Nancy Richey (1966), Maria Bueno (1965 and 1960);loss: Billie Jean King (1968)).
 Versus No. 2 seeds (overall, domestic, or foreign), Court was 7–0 (Evonne Goolagong (1973 and 1971), Kerry Melville (1970), Carole Caldwell Graebner (1966), Billie Jean Moffitt (1965), Lesley Turner (1964), Jan Lehane (1961)).
 Versus No. 3 seeds (overall, domestic, or foreign), Court was 4–0 (Rosemary Casals (1968), Jan Lehane (1964, 1963 and 1960)).
 Versus No. 4 seeds (overall, domestic, or foreign), Court was 5–1 (wins: Karen Krantzcke (1970), Kerry Melville (1973 and 1969), Yola Ramírez (1962), Mary Carter Reitano (1960);loss: Mary Carter Reitano (1959)).
 Versus No. 5 seeds (overall, domestic, or foreign), Court was 4–0 (Rosemary Casals (1969), Norma Baylon (1965), Robyn Ebbern (1963), Jan Lehane (1962)).
 Versus No. 6 seeds (overall, domestic, or foreign), Court was 1–0 (Madonna Schacht (1964)).
 Versus No. 7 seeds (overall, domestic, or foreign), Court was 2–0 (Madonna Schacht (1966), Rita Bentley (1963)).
 Versus No. 8 seeds (overall, domestic, or foreign), Court was 2–1 (wins: Karen Krantzcke (1973), Helen Gourlay (1971));loss: Martina Navratilova (1975).
 Versus No. 9 seeds (overall, domestic, or foreign), Court was 1–0 (Judy Tegart (1962)).

Against her major rivals at the Australian Championships/Australian Open, Court was 5–0 versus Jan Lehane O'Neill, 4–0 versus Evonne Goolagong Cawley, 3–0 versus Kerry Melville Reid, 2–0 versus Maria Bueno, 2–0 versus Rosemary Casals, 2–0 versus Lesley Turner Bowrey, 2–1 versus Billie Jean King, 1–0 versus Judy Tegart Dalton, 1–0 versus Françoise Dürr, 1–0 versus Nancy Richey, and 0–1 versus Martina Navratilova.

Federation Cup
Court played in the then-named Federation Cup since its inception in 1963, and then played again in 1964 and 1965. She returned to the tournament after her temporary retirement, and played again with the Australian Fed Cup team in 1968, 1969 and finally in December 1970. Of the six years she played, the Australian team won in four: 1964, 1965, 1968 and December 1970. She accumulated a total of 35 wins over her career, which ties with Evonne Goolagong Cawley and Dianne Balestrat as the third-most ever from an Australian. She holds a perfect 20–0 singles record, a near-perfect 40–1 singles set record, tying with Kerry Reid as the best-ever from an Australian. Her doubles record of 15–5 is the fifth-highest of an Australian.

Wins (4)

Participations (40)

Singles (20)

Doubles (20)

References

Tennis career statistics